Sentenciados (Sentenced in English) is Baby Rasta & Gringo's first album. The regular edition of the CD contains 22 tracks while the platinum edition contains 24.

Track listing
 Yo Soy Así (Baby Rasta track)
 Interlude
 Presidente de La Música
 Tú y Quién Más 
 Interlude 
 Yo Quiero Contigo
 El Carnaval 
 Avísame 
 Te Quiero Desnuda 
 Dime Si Eres Mía
 Peleando Con Mi Música (Baby Rasta track)
 La Vida Es Cruel
 Antes de Ser Cantante (Baby Rasta track)
 Ven Llale (Gringo track)
 Niña 
 Canchan (Baby Rasta track)
 Sentenciado Por Ti (feat. Cheka)
 Provócame (Chencho & Machito track)
 Sola  (Tony Tone y Kendo track)
 Esto Es Real (feat. Gastam)
 Sentenciado Por Ti [Remix] (feat. Cheka)
 Sin Rivales (Cheka track)

Platinum Edition Track listing
Disk 1:
 Avisame (Bachata Version)
 Dime Si Eres Mía (Inglés Version)
 Yo Soy Así
 Interlude
 Presidente de La Música
 Tú y Quién Más 
 Interlude 
 Yo Quiero Contigo
 El Carnaval 
 Avísame 
 Te Quiero Desnuda 
 Dime Si Eres Mía
 Peleando Con Mi Música 
 La Vida Es Cruel 
 Antes de Ser Cantante 
 Ven Llale
 Niña 
 Canchan 
 Sentenciado Por Ti (feat. Cheka)
 Provócame (Chencha y Machito track)
 Sola (Tony Tone y Kendo track)
 Esto Es Real (feat. Gastam)
 Sentenciado Por Ti (Remix) (feat. Cheka)
 Sin Rivales (Cheka track)

Disk 2: DVD

Charts

References

See also
List of number-one Billboard Tropical Albums from the 2000s

Baby Rasta & Gringo albums
2004 albums
2005 albums
Albums produced by Noriega